Māris Štrombergs (born 10 March 1987) is a Latvian former professional BMX racer. In the 2008 Summer Olympics he became the first Olympic champion in BMX cycling. Earlier that year he won the 2008 UCI BMX World Championships. In 2012 he prolonged his Olympic title by winning the gold medal in the London Olympics.

Štrombergs was born in Valmiera. His first trainer was Raimonds Ciesnieks. However, the longest collaboration was with Ivo Lakučs. Māris Štrombergs completed the Olympic 2008 BMX in about 36 seconds. Māris completed the Olympic 2012 BMX course in  37.576 seconds. Upon returning from the 2012 Olympics he was greeted by thousands of fans in hometown Valmiera.

On November 13, 2018 Māris Štrombergs announced his retirement.

Career bicycle motocross titles

Amateur/Junior Men
"2001 The European youth challenge (European Challenge) Champion"
"2005 European Junior Champion."
National Bicycle League (NBL)
None
American Bicycle Association (ABA)
None
Fédération Internationale Amateur de Cyclisme (FIAC)*

International Bicycle Motocross Federation (IBMXF)*

Union Cycliste Internationale (UCI)*
''1996 (Worlds Challenge Class), World Champion of nine years in boys' group.

Professional/Elite Men

National Bicycle League (NBL)
"2009 Elite Men ("AA") Pro Nat.#1"
"2010 Elite Men ("AA") Grand National Champion Nat.#1 Pro"
American Bicycle Association (ABA)
"2009 Vice-champion"
"2014 Pro Nat.#1 Men (AA)"
International Bicycle Motocross Federation (IBMXF)*
None (defunct)
Fédération Internationale Amateur de Cyclisme (FIAC)*
None (defunct. FIAC did not have a strictly professional division during its existence).
Union Cycliste Internationale (UCI)*
"2008 Elite Men Gold Medal World Champion"
"2010 Elite Men Gold Medal World Champion"
"2011 Elite Men Silver Medal World Champion"

References

External links 

 Official web page
 Latvian Cycling Federation - BMX
 Video of 2008 World Championships Final
 Latvian elite BMX website
 
 
 
 
 
 

1987 births
Living people
BMX riders
Latvian male cyclists
Olympic cyclists of Latvia
Olympic gold medalists for Latvia
Olympic medalists in cycling
Cyclists at the 2008 Summer Olympics
Cyclists at the 2012 Summer Olympics
Cyclists at the 2016 Summer Olympics
Medalists at the 2012 Summer Olympics
Medalists at the 2008 Summer Olympics
UCI BMX World Champions (elite men)
People from Valmiera